Palabra de mujer is the second studio album by Spanish recording artist Mónica Naranjo. The album was released on May 27, 1997, by Sony Music. It was certified Platinum in the Latin field by the RIAA for shipments of 100,000 copies and 10× Platinum (1,000,000 copies shipped) in Spain. It's her best selling album with over 2 million copies sold.

Track listing

Sales and certifications

See also
 List of best-selling albums in Spain
 List of best-selling Latin albums

References

1997 albums
Mónica Naranjo albums